Raja Kaliamman is a 2000 Indian Tamil-language devotional film directed by Rama Narayanan and starring Karan, Ramya Krishnan and Kausalya.

Plot 
The lives of a simple-minded woman named Meena, her brother Gopal and their pet snake will soon be changed when they look out for the village goddess who is forced out of her temple in a nearby village. They all flourish because of the blessings of the Maa, but these days will be over when Meena weds an evil man named Seemadorai, who is not who he really says he is, and without the goddesses blessings. Ramesh and her sister kills Gopal. Maa enters into Ramesh's house as a Gayatri who returns from the USA. Meena learns about the fact of Maa. And Maa will end up all the sufferings of Meena.

Cast 
 Karan as Seemadorai alias Kannayiram
 Ramya Krishnan as Sri Raja Kaliamman
 Kausalya as Meena
 Nizhalgal Ravi as Guru
 Vadivelu as Gopal
 Y. Vijaya as Seemadorai's elder sister
 Charan Raj as an astrologer

Soundtrack 

Soundtrack was composed by S. A. Rajkumar.

Reception
The Hindu wrote "The story is old, the way the characters enact their roles is ancient, and melodrama is predominant, especially in Vadivelu's expressions." BBThots called it "another movie that pushes Tamil movies even further backward along the progressive line". Chennai Online wrote "This film with its snakes, good and evil, and the Goddess all seem to be in the director’s favourite genre. Not a very intelligent audience in mind when he made this film! What is surprising is that such a film could come from the production house of a K. Balachander!".

References

External links 

Hindu devotional films
2000 films
2000s Tamil-language films
Films directed by Rama Narayanan
Films scored by S. A. Rajkumar